Protaetia lugubris is a species of beetle belonging to the family Cetoniidae.

It is native to Europe and Japan.

Synonym:
 ''Netocia lugubris

References

Cetoniinae
Beetles described in 1786